Karin Strenz (14 October 1967 – 21 March 2021) was a German politician who represented the CDU. Strenz served as a member of the Bundestag for the state of Mecklenburg-Vorpommern between 2009 and 2021.

Career 
Strenz was born in Lübz, Mecklenburg-Vorpommern. She became member of the Bundestag after the 2009 German federal election and was a member of the defense committee. Strenz was implicated in the Azerbaijani laundromat scandal. Subsequently her parliamentary immunity was lifted and several locations in Germany and Belgium were searched in January 2020.

Death
On 21 March 2021, Strenz fell unconscious during a flight between Cuba and Germany, following which the pilot decided to make an unscheduled landing at Shannon Airport, Ireland. Later she died in University Hospital Limerick, aged 53.

References

External links 

  
 Bundestag biography 

1967 births
2021 deaths
Members of the Bundestag for Mecklenburg-Western Pomerania
Female members of the Bundestag
21st-century German women politicians
Members of the Bundestag 2017–2021
Members of the Bundestag 2013–2017
Members of the Bundestag 2009–2013
Members of the Bundestag for the Christian Democratic Union of Germany
People from Lübz